Willy Scheepers (born 8 April 1961) was a Dutch football player who was the technical manager for the Marfin Laiki League club APEP Pitsilia until 2009.

Scheepers' brother was also a footballer who plays in the reserve side.

 2022 arrested and convicted for cocaine transportation.

External links
 League stats
 
 Vejle BK profile
 FC Zürich stats
 FC Oberwinterthur press release .pdf
 FC Kreuzlingen profile

1961 births
Living people
Dutch footballers
Dutch football managers
Dutch expatriate football managers
Expatriate football managers in Indonesia
Expatriate football managers in Cyprus
Association football defenders
Association football midfielders